Since Alaska became a U.S. state in 1959, it has sent  congressional delegations to the United States Senate and United States House of Representatives. Each state elects two senators to serve for six years, and member(s) of the House to two-year terms. Before becoming a state, the Territory of Alaska elected a non-voting delegate at-large to Congress from 1906 to 1959.

These are tables of congressional delegations from Alaska to the United States Senate and the United States House of Representatives.

Current delegation

Alaska's current congressional delegation in the  consists of its two senators, who are both Republicans and its sole representative, who is a Democrat. The current dean of the Alaska delegation is Senator Lisa Murkowski having served in the Senate since 2002. Lisa Murkowski is the first elected senator born in Alaska.

United States Senate

Each state elects two senators by statewide popular vote every six years. The terms of the two senators are staggered so that they are not elected in the same year, meaning that each seat also has a class determining the years in which the seat will be up for election. Alaska's senators are elected in classes 2 and 3.

There have been eight senators from Alaska, of whom four have been Democrats and four have been Republicans. Ernest Gruening was elected to the Senate on October 6, 1955 for the 84th Congress but did not take the oath of office and was not accorded senatorial privileges, since Alaska was not yet a state. Alaska's current senators, both Republicans, are Dan Sullivan, in office since 2015, and Lisa Murkowski, in office since 2002.

United States House of Representatives

1906–1959: 1 non-voting delegate

Starting on August 14, 1906, Alaska sent a non-voting delegate to the House. From May 17, 1884 to August 24, 1912, Alaska was designated as the District of Alaska. From then to January 3, 1959, it was the Alaska Territory.

1959–present: 1 seat

Since statehood on January 3, 1959, Alaska has had one seat in the House.

Key

See also

 List of United States congressional districts
 Alaska's congressional districts
 Political party strength in Alaska

Notes

References

Congressional delegations
Politics of Alaska
Alaska